Law enforcement in Canada is the responsibility of police services, special constabularies, and civil law enforcement agencies, which are operated by every level of government, some private and Crown corporations, and First Nations. In contrast to the United States or Mexico, and with the exception of the Unité permanente anticorruption (English: Permanent Anti-corruption Unit) in Quebec and the Organized Crime Agency of British Columbia, there are no organizations dedicated exclusively to the investigation of criminal activity in Canada. Criminal investigations are instead conducted by police services, which maintain specialized criminal investigation units in addition to their mandate for emergency response and general community safety.

Canada's provinces are responsible for the development and maintenance of police forces and special constabularies, and every province except Newfoundland and Labrador downloads this responsibility to municipalities, which can establish their own police forces or contract with a neighbouring community or the province for police services. Civil law enforcement, however, is the responsibility of the level or agency of government that developed those laws — the by-laws of a transit authority, for example, are enforced by that transit authority, while federal environmental regulations are enforced by the federal government. The federal government maintains its own police force, the Royal Canadian Mounted Police (RCMP, popularly known in English-speaking areas as the "Mounties"), which provides federal criminal law enforcement and contract police services to provinces and municipalities that don't maintain their own police forces.

Since the 1990s, a framework has existed for First Nations to establish their own police services, funded entirely by the federal and provincial governments and regulated by provinces. These police services generally receive less funding compared to other Canadian police forces — for example, in 2016, the Nishnawbe-Aski Police Service in Ontario received only 36% of the funding that the Ontario Provincial Police estimated it would cost to police the same area.

Police services
Police services in Canada are responsible for the maintenance of the King's peace through proactive patrols and emergency response, the enforcement of criminal law, and the enforcement of some civil law. Constitutionally, the delivery of police services is the responsibility of provinces and territories, but every province except for Newfoundland and Labrador, which maintains the Royal Newfoundland Constabulary to police some of its urban communities, downloads this responsibility to municipalities. The federal government also maintains its own police service, the Royal Canadian Mounted Police, which provinces and territories can contract to provide provincial and municipal policing. Every Canadian territory and province, with the exceptions of Ontario and Quebec, relies on the RCMP to provide at least some provincial or municipal police services.

The exact duties of Canadian police forces vary significantly. Some police services are responsible for municipal by-law enforcement, and because Canada has only two provincial organizations dedicated exclusively to criminal law enforcement, many large police forces maintain investigative units specialized in technical or financial crimes. In some provinces, police forces are obliged to investigate all traffic collisions, regardless of whether or not they resulted in injuries or serious damage. An increasing share of Canadian communities and police forces have adopted tiered police service delivery models, which reduce the responsibilities — but not powers or mandate — of police services and police officers, usually by employing unarmed peace officers to respond to lower-risk emergencies or enforce traffic regulations.

Federal
The federal government maintains two police forces: the Royal Canadian Mounted Police (RCMP); the Canadian Forces Military Police (CFMP).

The RCMP's first responsibility is the enforcement of federal laws, although contract policing for provinces, territories, municipalities, and First Nations is at the "heart of what the RCMP does." In addition to its contracts with three territories, eight provinces, 150 municipalities, and more than 600 Indigenous communities, the RCMP is responsible for border integrity; overseeing Canadian peacekeeping missions involving police; managing the Canadian Firearms Program, which licenses and registers firearms and their owners; and the Canadian Police College, which provides police training to Canadian and international police forces. The force has faced criticism for its uniquely broad mandate, and a partially-redacted 2019 memo to then-Minister of Public Safety Bill Blair "confirmed" for the Minister that "federal policing responsibilities have been and are being eroded to meet contract demands." Between 2012 and 2020, the RCMP gradually closed its money laundering and financial crimes units in British Columbia and Ontario, and in 2019, there were no RCMP officers in B.C. dedicated to investigating money laundering. In 2021, an all-party federal parliamentary committee recommended terminating the RCMP's contract policing program, and Public Safety Minister Marco Mendicino was mandated to conduct a review of RCMP contract policing when he took office in 2022.

The CFMP provides police, security, and operational support services to the Canadian Armed Forces (CAF) and the Department of National Defence (DND). As a military police force, the CFMP does not have a frontline community policing role, but CFMP members are considered peace officers under the Criminal Code. CFMP officers have authority over any person subject to the Code of Service Discipline (CSD), regardless of their position or rank, and can charge members of the broader public when a crime is committed on or in relation to DND property or assets, or at the request of the Minister of Public Safety, the Commissioner of the Correctional Service of Canada, or the Commissioner of the Royal Canadian Mounted Police. The ability of CFMP members to enforce provincial legislation varies, however, and in several provinces, CFMP officers can enforce neither traffic legislation nor mental health legislation — even on military bases. The CFMP maintains an investigations branch, the Canadian Forces National Investigation Service, which has the ability to investigate any crime concerning DND property or employees, except for sexual assault and intimate partner violence.

Railway police

Under the Railway Safety Act, any railway in Canada can request that a superior court judge appoint railway employees as police officers. These officers are hired, trained, and employed by the railway for the purposes of preventing crimes against the company and the protection of goods, materials, and public rail transit being moved through the railway network, and have nationwide jurisdiction within 500 metres of a railway line or as it relates to railway operations. As of 2022, the Canadian National Railway, Canadian Pacific Railway, and VIA Rail Canada Inc. - a Crown Corporation, each maintain their own police service. Some smaller railways and transit authorities, such as GO Transit, maintain special constabularies to protect passengers and property. TransLink, the transit authority for the Metro Vancouver Regional District in British Columbia, maintains a police force authorized by the province as opposed to the federal Railway Safety Act.

Railway police have attracted scrutiny and criticism for their privately-funded nature and role in investigating train derailments. In 2020, a former Canadian Pacific Police Service officer alleged that he was ordered to stop investigating a fatal 2019 railway derailment.

Provincial police

There are five provincial police services in Canada, maintained by four provinces, although only three are involved in frontline policing. The Ontario Provincial Police and Sûreté du Québec provide provincial police services to Ontario and Quebec respectively, the Royal Newfoundland Constabulary provides community police services to select urban communities in Newfoundland and Labrador, and the Organized Crime Agency of British Columbia and the Unité permanente anticorruption provide specialized criminal law enforcement services to British Columbia and Quebec respectively.

The Ontario Provincial Police and Sûreté du Québec are responsible for both provincial police services, such as the policing of provincial highways and the protection of provincial leaders, and the delivery of local police services to municipalities that do not maintain their own police forces, usually under contract. In Ontario, the OPP provides police services to municipalities without independent police forces regardless of whether or not there is a contract in place for them to do so, but contracts enable municipalities to direct police service priorities, have a role in selecting detachment commanders, and review police service performance, including complaints, on a regular basis. In Quebec, contract police services are available to any municipality — outside of those in urban agglomerations — with fewer than 50,000 residents. In 2021, a provincial committee recommended that the population threshold for contract police services be raised to 130,000 residents and that police forces serving populations under this threshold be folded into the Sûreté du Québec. 

The Organized Crime Agency of British Columbia (OCABC) is a designated policing unit, like the Metro Vancouver Transit Police and Stlʼatlʼimx Tribal Police Service, and is the "core agency" of the Combined Forces Special Enforcement Unit – British Columbia (CFSEU-BC). Although the OCABC still technically exists as of 2022, its officers are limited to conducting operations and investigations within the CFSEU-BC, where it has been it largely superseded by RCMP and municipal police officers seconded to the unit. Despite its status as the core agency of the combined unit, the CFSEU-BC is governed by RCMP policies and procedures rather than the policies and procedures of the OCABC. 

The Unité permanente anticorruption was created in 2011 and tasked with investigations into corrupt government procurement practices, but relied on secondments from other police services until 2018, when it became its own police force. It has been plagued with allegations of criminal activity since 2021, when it was revealed that members hid evidence from defence lawyers, were prepared to lie under oath, and strategically leaked information to the press to promote the unit's activities — and, in the process, interrupted and ultimately stopped legal proceedings against a former politician.

The Royal Newfoundland Constabulary is a provincial police force, but does not provide provincial police services across the entire province. Instead, the responsibility for provincial police services is split between the RCMP, which provides local and provincial police services to Newfoundland and Labrador's largely rural interior, and the Constabulary, which provides local and provincial police services to the northeast Avalon Peninsula (metropolitan St. John's), the City of Corner Brook, and western Labrador (Churchill Falls, Labrador City, and Wabush).

Municipal police

Municipal police forces make up the bulk of Canadian police services, and are generally responsible for all criminal matters within their jurisdiction. There are municipal police services in nine provinces, with 12 in British Columbia, seven in Alberta, 12 in Saskatchewan, 10 in Manitoba, 44 in Ontario, 31 in Quebec, nine in New Brunswick, 10 in Nova Scotia, and three in Prince Edward Island. Although most large cities in Canada maintain their own police forces, many police services are maintained by rural communities, and several have only a handful of police officers. The police services in the Rural Municipality of Vanscoy No. 345, Saskatchewan, the Town of Luseland, Saskatchewan, and the Rural Municipality of Cornwallis, Manitoba have one officer each. As the delivery of police services is a provincial responsibility, each province has its own set of standards that police services must meet. In several provinces, such as Ontario, police services must be able to provide 24/7 coverage, investigate all criminal matters, and provide for specialized units such as police dogs.

Beginning in the 1970s, and continuing into the 1990s, several municipal police forces were amalgamated (alongside, in many cases, the municipalities they served) into new, regional bodies in the interest of creating efficiencies and reducing costs. As of 2022, there are regional police forces in British Columbia, Ontario, Quebec, New Brunswick, and Nova Scotia. The adoption of regional policing has been controversial, however, and a review of nine Canadian police services in 2016 found that there were no significant differences in cost or service quality between regional and non-regional police forces, and a separate 2015 literature review found that larger police services are less effective and more expensive than those serving about 50,000 people. As of 2022, police regionalization continues to be proposed by both provinces and municipalities, particularly for metropolitan areas where several urban municipalities that border one another each maintain independent police services.

Strength

In 2019, there were 100,417 active police officers in Canada.

Canadian police strength reached a peak in 1975, when there were 206 officers per 100,000 people. Although the current number reflects a significant rise in the total police strength in the country (the highest in twelve years after steady declines in the 1980s and 1990s), Canada still employs fewer police officers per capita than Wales (262/100,000).

Provincially, Nova Scotia had the highest number of officers per capita (193.8/100,000) in 2019. The lowest numbers per capita were in Prince Edward Island and New Brunswick. The three territories, while having far fewer police officers in absolute terms, have around twice as many police officers per capita as the more populous, less remote provinces.

Special constabularies

In Canada, special constables are sworn peace officers granted police powers to enforce specific legislation in a distinct context or geographic area. Special constables are regulated differently in each province and territory, and as such, there is no consistent definition of a special constabulary in Canada. Typically, a special constabulary is any law enforcement organization composed of special constables (as opposed to police officers) with a mandate for criminal law enforcement and/or general peacekeeping and security. Civil law enforcement agencies which maintain a proactive posture and a role in frontline policing, such as conservation and commercial vehicle enforcement services, are sometimes considered special constabularies.

Special constabularies are used extensively in southern Ontario, where they are maintained by transit authorities, universities, park authorities, and some social housing corporations. In Alberta, Saskatchewan, Newfoundland and Labrador, Quebec, Nunavut, the Northwest Territories, and Yukon municipalities and other government agencies can raise special constabularies to enforce by-laws, traffic regulations, and other civil legislation, but not the Criminal Code. In those four provinces and three territories, municipal special constabularies are distinct from ordinary municipal by-law enforcement agencies in their proactive posture, role in frontline policing, and enforcement of provincial legislation. In 2021, the City of Moncton, New Brunswick, requested that the provincial government amend provincial legislation to allow municipalities in the province to maintain special constabularies able to enforce provincial legislation like those in Alberta and Quebec. 

In Quebec, Special constables are peace officers. The mission of special constables is to maintain peace, order and public security, to prevent and repress crime and, according to the jurisdiction specified in their deeds of appointment, to enforce the law and municipal by-laws, and to apprehend offenders.

Legislative security

British Columbia and Ontario both maintain special constabularies for the purposes of protecting their provincial legislatures. Select special constables with both of these security services were armed with handguns in the wake of the 2014 Parliament Hill shooting. In Alberta, legislative security is provided by the Alberta Sheriffs Branch, an armed provincial special constabulary also responsible for courtroom security, traffic enforcement on provincial highways, and some criminal investigations. In Saskatchewan, the legislative buildings are protected by contracted security guards, but the Provincial Protective Service (responsible for the provincial highway patrol, sheriffs officers, and conservation officers) maintains a special constabulary that patrols Wascana Centre, the park that surrounds the provincial legislature. The federal parliament buildings in Ottawa are protected by the Parliamentary Protective Service, which was formed by amalgamating the House of Commons Security Services, Senate Protective Service, and the RCMP parliamentary precinct detachment. The Service, which was formed after the 2014 Parliament Hill shooting, is not a special constabulary, and only some of its members have the powers of a peace officer.

Civil law enforcement

Civil law enforcement agencies are responsible for the specialized enforcement of civil legislation. Civil law enforcement agencies are maintained by every level of government, a variety of government corporations and authorities, and First Nations.

Federal
The federal government maintains several civil law enforcement agencies, most prominent among them the Canada Border Services Agency, which manages Canadian ports of entry and enforces the Customs Act, the Immigration and Refugee Protection Act, and the Quarantine Act. The Agency also operates a Criminal Investigations Unit that investigates criminal violations of CBSA-enforced legislation, such as smuggling or immigration fraud. The government of Canada also employs fishery officers, who enforce federal fishing and fishery regulations; transport inspectors, who enforce the 23 different pieces of federal transportation legislation the Minister of Transport is responsible for; and Environment and Climate Change Canada enforcement officers, who are responsible for enforcing federal environmental regulations. The Canada Revenue Agency operates a variety of compliance and enforcement divisions, but its proactive criminal enforcement unit, which collaborated with RCMP officers to break up organized crime rings, was disbanded after budget cuts in 2012. (The RCMP disbanded its various counterparts to the CRA's criminal enforcement unit between 2012 and 2020.) The federal government also operates the Competition Bureau, which enforces the Competition Act, the Consumer Packaging and Labelling Act, the Textile Labelling Act and the Precious Metals Marking Act. Parks Canada maintains a park warden service, which is responsible for the enforcement of the Canada National Parks Act, the Species at Risk Act, and park-specific legislation.

Provincial and territorial
Each province and territory in Canada operates or authorizes a variety of civil law enforcement agencies, including employment standards and workplace safety offices, animal cruelty organizations, and environmental enforcement services. Because of the wide-ranging regulatory powers of provinces, and the technical, specialized nature of much of civil law enforcement, many provincial civil law enforcement agencies operate in obscurity. The two most prominent uniformed civil law enforcement services operated by provinces and territories are commercial vehicle and conservation enforcement agencies, which usually maintain proactive patrols and education programs. While conservation officers in every province and territory are routinely armed, only the provinces of Alberta, Saskatchewan, and New Brunswick deploy armed commercial vehicle enforcement officers. Some provinces, such as Ontario, empower provincial corporations and authorities to establish and maintain their own civil law enforcement agencies, separate from the provincial government.

Sheriffs services

Almost every province and territory in Canada maintains a sheriffs service, although their role and powers vary between jurisdictions. In most provinces and all three territories, sheriffs are limited to providing courtroom security, enforcing court orders, and transporting offenders to and from court. In Quebec, sheriffs have no security function and are instead limited to enforcing court orders and selecting juries. Since 2006, the province of Alberta has gradually expanded the mandate and powers of its sheriffs service, which now maintains a highway patrol, a criminal investigations unit, and provides legislative security to the Legislative Assembly of Alberta. Ontario is the only province or territory in Canada that doesn't maintain a sheriffs service — instead, court security and prisoner transport duties are handled by local police services, and the enforcement of court orders is the responsibility of the Superior Court of Justice Enforcement Office, which was named and is still sometimes referred to as the sheriff's office.

Municipal

Every municipality in Canada is authorized to develop and enforce municipal by-laws, but each province and territory regulates the authority of municipal law enforcement agencies differently. In British Columbia, Manitoba, Ontario, Nova Scotia, and Prince Edward Island, municipal enforcement agencies are generally limited to the enforcement of municipal legislation and operate on an as-requested basis. In all three territories, as well as the provinces of Newfoundland and Labrador, Quebec, Saskatchewan, and Alberta, some — but not all — municipal enforcement agencies also enforce provincial legislation and control traffic. Several municipalities rely on police services or contracted commissionaires for bylaw enforcement.

Indigenous law enforcement

Indigenous peoples in Canada are defined in the Constitution Act, 1982 as First Nations, Inuit, and Métis peoples, and the law enforcement powers of Indigenous governments vary significantly between the different groups. Métis self-government exists only in eight settlements in Alberta, none of which have the authority to raise police services, but may, with provincial approval, establish bylaw enforcement agencies. The territory of Nunavut and regional government of Kativik, both of which are populated mostly by Inuit peoples, were established after Inuit land claims agreements, but are not exclusive to Inuit peoples, have authority over police services. First Nations and Inuit communities governed by the Indian Act have access to the First Nations and Inuit Policing Program operated by Public Safety Canada and can establish their own police forces, funded entirely by the federal and provincial governments, but most Inuit governments and First Nations that have completed the comprehensive land claims process can only contract police services to a third party police force (although frameworks exist for these Nations to eventually establish their own independent police services). Because of the history of the Canadian reserve system, which operated on the assumption that Indigenous families required less land than settler families and routinely gave away reserve lands to settlers without Indigenous consultation or consent, many reserves are too small to sustain independent police forces, requiring First Nations to form regional police agencies with neighbouring communities or contract with the federal or provincial governments for police services.

Background
The policing of Indigenous communities in Canada has long been fraught with racial tension, inequitable police service delivery, and the enforcement of colonial laws and practices. Beginning in the 1960s, the federal government began to withdraw RCMP officers from reserves in the provinces of Ontario and Quebec in favour of provincial control over First Nations policing. Between 1990 and 1995, there were several high-profile conflicts between Indigenous protesters demanding the return of lands to which they had Aboriginal title and non-Indigenous police forces, resulting in the death of a police officer — Corporal Marcel Lemay of the Sûreté du Québec — and an unarmed Indigenous protester named Dudley George. During the 1995 Gustafsen Lake standoff, an RCMP commander reportedly told a subordinate to kill a prominent Indigenous demonstrator and "smear the prick and everyone with him," and an RCMP media liaison officer was quoted as saying that "smear campaigns are [the RCMP's] specialty."

The federal government created the First Nations and Inuit Policing Program in 1992, which scholars have called the first "comprehensive national policing strategy for [a country's] Aboriginal peoples." The Program was designed to allow First Nations and Inuit communities to create their own police forces that met the provincial standards for non-Indigenous police services, or establish their own RCMP detachment staffed by Indigenous officers, but has been criticized as underfunded and discriminatory by Indigenous groups, police chiefs, and the Canadian Human Rights Tribunal.

Police services

In 2010, there were 38 self-administered First Nation police services in Canada, with one service each in British Columbia, Saskatchewan, and Manitoba; three services in Alberta; nine in Ontario; and 23 in Quebec, although that number had decreased to 22 by 2020. First Nations police services are required to meet different standards in each province. In British Columbia, First Nations police services are considered "designated policing units" and placed in the same category as the Metro Vancouver Transit Police. In Alberta, First Nations police services cannot maintain specialized resources, such as police dogs, and must consult with the RCMP before completing investigations into major crimes. In Quebec, however, First Nations police services have the "same missions, responsibilities, and powers [as non-Indigenous police forces] under Quebec police law." First Nations police services in Ontario are considered programs, not essential services, and are not required to meet standards under that province's Police Services Act unless police leadership decides to apply for an opt-in.

Many First Nations police services face serious funding shortfalls. In January 2006, two Indigenous men burned to death and an officer was seriously injured in a rescue attempt at a Nishnawbe-Aski Police Service detachment that the police force couldn't afford to bring into compliance with the fire code. (Two years later, the service had only one detachment that met provincial standards.) Other First Nations police services have struggled to pay for officers' wages and benefits or fill frontline positions because of budget shortfalls. In 2022, the Canadian Human Rights Tribunal found that the federal government, which unilaterally sets the budgets for First Nations police forces participating in the First Nations and Inuit Policing Program, engaged in discrimination when it failed to provide adequate funding to the Mashteuiatsh Innu Nation's police force.

In 2022, the British Columbia Special Committee on Reforming the Police Act unanimously recommended that the First Nations and Inuit Policing Program be replaced with a "new legislative and funding framework, consistent with international and domestic policing best practices and standards," and noted that "a truly decolonized lens would see Indigenous police services as an option for neighbouring municipalities or regions." Earlier that same year, the federal government began engaging First Nations about changes to the program and Indigenous police legislation.

Civil law enforcement
Every form of Indigenous government has the power to enact and enforce by-laws. Métis settlements receive their authority from the Alberta Metis Settlements Act, and First and Inuit nations receive their authority either from the Indian Act or the relevant comprehensive land claim agreement. However, because the Indian Act doesn't specify whether by-law violations should be prosecuted in federal or provincial and territorial courts, some provincial courts will not prosecute Indigenous laws. The federal government ended a program that allowed Indigenous governments to appoint federal judges to enforce Indigenous laws in specialized courts in 2004, and as of 2022, few Indigenous governments exercise their powers to enact and enforce by-laws.

Several First Nations, such as the Asubpeeschoseewagong First Nation in northern Ontario, rely on police services to enforce by-laws, while others maintain dedicated by-law enforcement agencies. First Nations in Saskatchewan and Alberta can maintain special constabularies for the enforcement of Indigenous and provincial legislation. Some First Nations police services will not enforce Indigenous laws.

Community safety organizations
Several First Nations operate community safety organizations with few or no law enforcement powers. The Musqueam First Nation in British Columbia maintains a Safety and Security Department, responsible for emergency management, community patrols, and "ensur[ing] compliance" with Musqueam by-laws. The Fort McKay First Nation in the Alberta oil sands maintains a Park Ranger Program, staffed by peace officers able to enforce First Nation by-laws but only report violations of provincial or federal law, to patrol the reserve's parks and wilderness and provide assistance and education to band members and visitors. In Yukon, First Nations can hire community safety officers, who — unlike community safety officers in Saskatchewan — have no law enforcement or police powers and are instead tasked with patrolling communities, engaging with residents, and responding to emergencies. Many of these agencies are composed mostly or entirely of elders. Some First Nations in Saskatchewan operate "peacekeeper" programs, whose staff do not have law enforcement or police powers, to respond to non-violent calls for service, vehicle accidents, and fires.

In Winnipeg, Manitoba, public safety services are provided to urban Indigenous populations by the all-volunteer Bear Clan Patrol, as well as other organizations, such as the Mama Bear Clan. The Patrol conducts regular patrols of Indigenous neighbourhoods, liaises with Winnipeg Police to search for missing people, and delivers food to unhoused residents.

Tiered policing

Tiered policing is a model of police service delivery that involves hiring non-police employees — or empowering separate organizations — to specialize in areas of a police service's mandate or assume lower-risk duties. Although tiered policing has been practiced in Canada since the 1960s, when police forces first began hiring non-sworn personnel to handle administrative duties or conduct forensic investigations, it became increasingly popular in the late 1990s as police services and governments sought to reduce costs, simplify hiring and training processes, and deliver higher quality services by using civilians or unarmed peace officers to deliver frontline police services.

The Winnipeg Police Service and Vancouver Police Department both employ special constables to guard crime scenes, respond to some non-violent calls for service, and direct traffic at emergencies. Police services in Ontario have practiced tiered policing since the 1980s, when special constables first began to assume court protection and prisoner transport duties, but several police forces including the Brantford Police Service, Cobourg Police Service, and Toronto Police Service now deploy special constables and volunteer auxiliary constables in frontline policing roles. In all three territories, Alberta, Saskatchewan, the Urban agglomeration of Montreal, Newfoundland and Labrador, and parts of southern Ontario, tiered police service delivery includes separate special constabularies, which provide police services to municipalities served by regional or contracted police forces and to specific organizations, such as universities or transit systems.  Since 2021, the Royal Canadian Mounted Police has employed Civilian Criminal Investigators, unarmed peace officers recruited from non-police fields, to assist with technical computer science or financial crimes.

In some communities, the adoption of tiered policing has been hampered by "outdated" perceptions that special constables and other non-police specialists are untrained, ill-equipped, or assuming less important duties compared to police. Some police services have also struggled with social rankings that result in the exclusion of non-police staff from events and workplace conversations.

Tiered policing has been compared to and proposed as an alternative policy response to proposals to "de-task" and "defund" the police service.

Non-police mental health crisis response
In 2000, the Toronto Police Service partnered with local hospitals to create the Mobile Crisis Intervention Team, which pairs nurses with frontline police officers to respond to mental health crises. The program is only active in some parts of the City, and only during the afternoon and early evening, although it has gradually expanded since its introduction.

Similar programs exist in parts of Ontario; parts of Metro Vancouver and Vancouver Island; Alberta and Saskatchewan, where they are operated by each province's respective provincial health authority; Winnipeg, Manitoba; Saint John, New Brunswick; the Halifax Regional Municipality; Newfoundland and Labrador; and some First Nations. Many of these services operate part-time, restrict their clientele to certain demographics (such as youths), and have only a few teams to cover a large area. There are no mobile mental health crisis response teams in Quebec or Canada's territories, although the Nunavut RCMP began talks with the Nunavut Justice Department in 2020 to implement a unit.

Following the death of Regis Korchinski-Paquet, the Toronto Police Service expanded its Mobile Crisis Intervention Team and began dispatching members of the team through 9-1-1 calls, rather than by back-up requests from other officers. The City of Toronto also launched a new crisis response team, the Community Crisis Service, in 2022. The service, which is composed entirely of unarmed, non-police specialists, operates 24 hours a day, six days a week. Prince Edward Island launched a similar program in 2021, where a specialized team of paramedics would attend mental health distress calls made to the province's mental health crisis hotline alongside police, who would be dispatched if necessary in their own vehicles and receive no specialized training.

Organization

Ranks

Canadian police ranks are largely consistent with those used by British and Commonwealth police services. Uniquely, Canadian police services use the title "staff" in place of "chief" for certain ranks, such as staff sergeant or staff inspector. Chief of Police is the title of the head of most Canadian police forces, except in British Columbia (where police executives are called Chief Constable or Chief Officer) and Quebec (where police executives are called Directors). The Royal Canadian Mounted Police and Ontario Provincial Police both use the title "Commissioner." Special constabularies typically use the same rank structure as police services, while civil law enforcement agencies usually use role-based rank titles, opting for ranks like "supervisor" instead of "sergeant."

Equipment

Weapons

Frontline police officers in Canada are usually equipped with semi-automatic 9mm calibre handguns. Some special constables, most notably those employed by the Niagara Parks Police Service, federal park wardens, and conservation officers also carry handguns. Most police cruisers are equipped with carbine rifles and other long guns designed to fire less-lethal ammunition. Police officers and special constables are also usually equipped with collapsible batons and pepper spray.

Police services have equipped officers with Tasers as early as 2001, but their use has been controversial. In one 2021 incident, a judge stayed all charges against a man who was repeatedly tasered by an Edmonton police officer after a brief foot chase, finding that the officer had tasered him "out of frustration" and violated their police force's Taser policies. In 2007, RCMP officers killed Robert Dziekański, a Polish citizen, with a Taser at the Vancouver International Airport. The incident prompted the Toronto Police Service and Royal Newfoundland Constabulary to put orders for Tasers on hold. (Both forces eventually acquired Tasers.) Taser deployments, and particularly their use against people experiencing mental health crises, continued to attract public scrutiny as of 2022.

Body-worn cameras
Compared to American police forces, Canadian police and law enforcement agencies have been slow to adopt body-worn cameras. The first police force to acquire body-worn cameras on a permanent basis was the single-officer police service in the Rural Municipality of Cornwallis, Manitoba, in 2016. In the wake of protests following the murder of George Floyd in Minneapolis, body-worn cameras were adopted by several Canadian police forces, including the Toronto Police Service, Cobourg Police Service, Kentville Police Service, and Saint John Police Force. The RCMP planned to roll body-worn cameras out starting in late 2021, but had not yet awarded a contract for supplying the cameras as of November of that year.

Some special constabularies, such as the Saskatchewan Highway Patrol, also use body-worn cameras. The Happy Valley-Goose Bay Municipal Enforcement Department, a special constabulary in Newfoundland and Labrador, equipped its officers with body-worn cameras briefly in 2021 before the province's privacy commissioner recommended that the Town stop the program because of concerns that video footage was not adequately protected.

Uniforms

Each law enforcement agency in Canada has its own uniform and identity, which must meet provincial or territorial regulations that ensure some consistency between different agencies. Although these regulations vary between jurisdictions, there are regional similarities in the Prairies and Atlantic Canada. Nationwide, almost every public safety and law enforcement agency equips their members with bulletproof vests, usually worn over the uniform shirt and with title boards (such as "Community Safety Officer" or "Police") that identify their legal status.

In Alberta, Saskatchewan, Manitoba, and Ontario, and New Brunswick, municipal police officers must wear navy blue dress shirts and navy blue trousers with red trouser piping. In British Columbia, Prince Edward Island, and Nova Scotia, municipal police officers generally wear royal blue trouser piping instead of red. Blue trouser piping is required by regulation in British Columbia, but in practice, this is rarely implemented. In Quebec, police officers are not required to wear trouser piping.

In British Columbia, Newfoundland and Labrador, and the territories, municipal peace officers generally wear navy blue dress shirts and navy blue trousers with red trouser piping. In Alberta, peace officers and special constables are generally required to wear light grey shirts and navy blue trousers with matching light grey trouser piping. In every other province, there are no consistent regulations for special constables and peace officers except that their uniforms be clearly distinct from those worn by police officers.

Prior to the widespread use of special constables and peace officers in frontline policing roles, public safety and law enforcement officers had generally similar uniforms regardless of their legal status. In the Canadian Prairies, police and peace officers typically wore light grey shirts. The Royal Canadian Mounted Police is the only police service in Canada that still uses light grey dress shirts for frontline police officers, although Parks Canada Park Wardens also wear grey dress shirts with dark green trousers.    In most other provinces, police officers typically wore light blue shirts. The adoption of navy blue shirts began in the 1990s and was primarily driven by a desire to make uniforms more professional, as police executives felt that lighter colours showed dirt and sweat too readily.

Historically, police and peace officers in Canada wore their badges on their caps and were generally required to wear their forage caps at all times. In British Columbia, Alberta, and Quebec, this requirement no longer exists, although some police services still require that frontline police officers wear some form of headgear. Beginning in the mid-2010s, an increasing share of police forces in Ontario have allowed frontline officers to wear ballcaps instead of forage caps.

Vehicles

As part of their authority to establish, maintain, and regulate law enforcement agencies, some provinces regulate the models of vehicle that can be used by police services for frontline policing. In the late 2010s and early 2020s, many Canadian police services began ordering vehicles painted grey, navy blue, or black to replace white- and silver-coloured cruisers, sparking controversy about their accessibility to the public and visibility in low-light conditions. More recently, in the early 2020s, some police services in Ontario began to pilot Battenburg markings. In every province and territory, police services are entitled to use red and blue lights on marked and unmarked emergency vehicles.

Most special constabularies use fleets of marked police-model vehicles, and many are painted in colours that reflect the larger corporate branding scheme of their parent organization. In Alberta and Saskatchewan, vehicles maintained by special constabularies must have two blue reflective stripes, the organization's logo, and text that reads "Peace Officer" (in Alberta) or "Community Safety Officer" (in Saskatchewan) on the bottom of the passenger doors. In Quebec, special constabularies are restricted to using red emergency lights exclusively, and in Ontario, special constables can only use emergency lights or sirens if authorized by the relevant police services board. In every other province and in all three territories, including Alberta and Saskatchewan, special constabularies can use red and blue lights.

Only some civil law enforcement agencies operate marked vehicles, and the exact markings vary significantly based on the role and nature of the agency. Some agencies, which are operated by police services, use vehicles that are painted in variations of the larger police force's livery, while others operated directly by municipalities or provinces may use vehicles from the larger motor pool, marked only with the parent organization's logo. In British Columbia, by-law enforcement officers are authorized to use red lights, and in Ontario, civil law enforcement officers enforcing emissions or commercial vehicle regulations may use red and blue lights and sirens. In every province and territory, civil law enforcement officers employed by conservation officer or commercial vehicle enforcement services can use red and blue lights. Civil law enforcement officers are otherwise restricted to amber lights.

See also 

 Canadian Association of Police Governance
 Crime in Canada
 Indigenous police in Canada
 International Criminal Police Organization (Interpol)
 Law enforcement by country
 List of law enforcement agencies
 List of law enforcement agencies in Canada
 List of countries by size of police forces
 Missing and murdered Indigenous women and girls (MMIWG)
 Terrorism in Canada

References